Malmö FF competed in Allsvenskan for the 1932–33 season.

Club

Other information

References
 

Malmö FF seasons
Malmo FF
Swedish football clubs 1932–33 season